KNWZ (970 AM) is a news/talk station owned and operated by Alpha Media LLC in Coachella, California. It is part of a simulcast with KNWQ AM 1140 in Palm Springs and KNWH AM 1250 in Yucca Valley, California. The stations combine to serve the Coachella Valley and Yucca Valley area, and surrounding desert cities.

In October 2009, K-News began to operate an FM radio translator on 94.3 MHz from Desert Hot Springs covering the entire Coachella Valley. In 2016, KNWZ began to be heard on 103.7 in the Twentynine Palms area. In 2018, it added a translator on 104.7 FM for the Palm Springs area, in addition to 94.3 FM from Coachella.

Programs
KNWZ/KNWQ/KNWH carries such programs as Sean Hannity, Rush Limbaugh, Mark Levin Show, Savage Nation with Michael Savage and Coast to Coast AM with George Noory as well as the locally-produced “Bulldog” Bill Feingold show in the morning and Hot Talk with Rich and Paul in afternoon drive.

History
The station began broadcasting in 1954, holding the call sign KCHV. It ran 1,000 watts, during daytime hours only, and was owned by the Coachella Valley Broadcasting Company. In 1963, its daytime power was increased to 5,000 watts and it began nighttime operations, running 1,000 watts.

On August 26, 1983, the station's call sign was changed to KVIM. On September 1, 1989, its call sign was changed to KCLB. Spanish language formats were aired as KVIM and KCLB.

KNWZ
KNWZ debuted at 1270AM in 1988 under the ownership of William Hart as the area's second attempt at an all-news format in the style of KNX and others, but soon converted to a talk radio format. Jerry Jolstead had sold the station and Hart purchased it from Mary and Kate Neiswender.  The morning drive slot was occupied from 1994-2000 by Luigi Rossetti under the air name of "Lou Penrose." Rossetti left the station at the height of his popularity to accept a position as District Director for Congresswoman Mary Bono. The Lou Penrose Morning Talk Show was followed from 9-11a.m. by former television newsman Ron Fortner. Poor ratings led to Fortner's dismissal by 1998 immediately after the purchase of the station by Morris Communications as part of the new Desert Radio Group.

The station had been simulcast on two FM repeaters and one other station (94.3, 103.9 and 106.9) from April 1995 to October 1998, when Morris purchased the stations; it then converted all three of the FM stations to music formats. Morris then moved KNWZ to 970/1140AM on January 1, 2001.

Morris sold the three stations, along with thirty others, to Alpha Media LLC for $38.25 million, effective September 1, 2015.

References

External links

News and talk radio stations in the United States
NWZ
Mass media in Riverside County, California
Coachella, California
Radio stations established in 1954
1954 establishments in California
Alpha Media radio stations